TZ Mensae is a binary star in the southern circumpolar constellation Mensa. The system has a combined maximum apparent magnitude of 6.19, placing it near the limit for naked eye visibility. Parallax measurements place the system at a distance of 403 light years. The radial velocity is small.

The components of TZ Mensae have stellar classifications of A0 V and A8 V, both indicating that they are ordinary A-type main-sequence stars. As for the companion, it has a temperature of 7,178 K. and a luminosity less than  The rotation of both stars is apparently synchronous with the orbital period, with projected rotational velocities of  respectively. The system is estimated to be 141 million years old.

The two components take about 8 days to revolve around each other in a relatively circular orbit. If the brighter component is eclipsing the dimmer one, the brightness drops to 6.36. If vice versa, it drops to 6.87, which is below the limit for naked eye visibility.

References

Mensa (constellation)
A-type main-sequence stars
Algol variables
Eclipsing binaries
Mensae, TZ
Mensae, 31
CD-84 00063
039780
025776
2059